Qaplan Tu (also Romanized as Qaplān Tū and Qaplāntū) is a village in Gol Tappeh Rural District, Ziviyeh District, Saqqez County, Kurdistan Province, Iran. At the 2006 census, its population was 711, in 166 families. The village is populated by Kurds.

Name 
The name "Qaplan Tu" is Mongolian in origin and means "having panthers". The name of the Qaflankuh mountains has the same etymology, although its current form is slightly distorted from the original.

References 

Towns and villages in Saqqez County
Kurdish settlements in Kurdistan Province